Zakrzew  is a village in the administrative district of Gmina Grabów nad Pilicą, within Kozienice County, Masovian Voivodeship, in east-central Poland.

The village has a population of 100.

References

External links 

Zakrzew